Little Kashubian Tricity is a name used for an urban area in northern Poland comprising the three towns of Rumia, Reda and Wejherowo, located in Wejherowo County, Pomeranian Voivodeship, and within the ethnocultural region of Kashubia. The moniker is a reference to the bigger conurbation of Tricity, located adjacently, to the southeast, on the coast of the Baltic. Little Kashubian Tricity has a population of 120,158 people (2012), and occupies an area of 88 km2.

External links 
Official website

Kashubia
Cities and towns in Poland